In Maya mythology, Ixpiyacoc was one of the thirteen creator gods who helped construct humanity.

See also
 Xmucane and Xpiayoc

Creator gods
Maya gods

es:Ixpiyacoc